Ceuthophilus hesperus, the San Diego camel cricket, is a species of camel cricket in the family Rhaphidophoridae. It is found in North America.

Subspecies
These 10 subspecies belong to the species Ceuthophilus hesperus:
 Ceuthophilus gracilipes apalachicolae Hubbell, 1936
 Ceuthophilus gracilipes gracilipes (Haldeman, 1850)
 Ceuthophilus guttulosus angulosus Eades, 1962
 Ceuthophilus guttulosus guttulosus F. Walker, 1869
 Ceuthophilus guttulosus nigricans Scudder, 1894 (yellow-bellied camel cricket)
 Ceuthophilus guttulosus thomasi Hubbell, 1936
 Ceuthophilus hesperus clunicornis Hubbell, 1936
 Ceuthophilus hesperus eino Rentz & Weissman, 1981
 Ceuthophilus hesperus hesperus Hubbell, 1936
 Ceuthophilus hesperus transitans Hubbell, 1936

References

hesperus
Articles created by Qbugbot
Insects described in 1936